The 8th Annual Bengal Film Journalists' Association Awards were held on 1945, honoring the best Indian cinema in 1944.

Main Awards

Best Indian Films (In Order of Merit) 
 Ramshastri
 Udayer Pathey
 Shakuntala
 Wapas
 Sandhi
 Parakh
 Daasi
 Fashion
 Chadmabeshi
 Zameen

Best Director 
 Bimal Roy - Udayer Pathey

Best Actor 
 Radhamohan - Udayer Pathey

Best Actress 
 Sumitra Devi - Sandhi

Best Actor in Supporting Role 
 Biswanath Bhaduri - Udayer Pathey

Best Actress in Supporting Role 
 Rekha Mitra - Udayer Pathey

Best Cinematographer 
 Bimal Roy - Udayer Pathey

Best Music Director 
 Anil Bagchi - Sandhi

Best Lyricist 
 Sailen Roy - Udayer Pathey

Best Audiographer 
 Atul Chatterjee - Udayer Pathey

Best Dialogue 
 Sailen Roy - Udayer Pathey

Best Art Director 
 Souren Sen - Udayer Pathey

Best Screenplay 
 Udayer Pathey

Hindi Section

Best Director 
 Gajanan Jagirdar - Ramshastri

Best Actor 
 Gajanan Jagirdar - Ramshastri

Best Actress 
 Mehtab - Parakh

Best Actor in Supporting Role 
 Ananta Marathe - Ramshastri
 Shah Nawaz - Hamari Baat

Best Actress in Supporting Role 
 Kamala Chatterjee - Shankar Parvati

Best Music Director 
 R. C. Boral - Wapas

Best Lyricist 
 Narendra Sharma - Hamari Baat

Best Cinematographer 
 Sudhin Majumder - Wapas

Best Audiographer 
 A. K. Parmar - Shakuntala

Best Dialogue 
 Bhagabati Charan Varma - Hamari Baat

Best Art Director 
 Bal Gajbar - Shakuntala

Best Screenplay 
 Ramshastri

Foreign Film Section

Ten Best Films 
 The Song of Bernadette
 Madame Curie
 Since You Went Away
 For Whom the Bell Tolls
 It Happened Tomorrow
 The Constant Nymph
 Going My Way
 Mission to Moscow
 Heaven Can Wait
 Jane Eyre

Best Director 
 Leo McCarey - Going My Way

Best Actor 
 Robert Walker - Since You Went Away

Best Actress 
 Jennifer Jones - The Song of Bernadette

References 

Bengal Film Journalists' Association Awards